Kevin Walker (born 12 September 1991) is a Scottish footballer who last played for Stirling University as a goalkeeper.

Career
Walker began his footballing career at Falkirk's Academy, but left the club in 2010, signing with Stirling University. He was a part of the club which won the East of Scotland Football League.

On 28 May 2013, Walker signed a one-year deal with Scottish Championship side Livingston. On 30 August he made his debut, in a 0–3 away defeat against Dundee.

In the summer of 2015, Walker signed for Berwick Rangers in the SPFL League Two, ahead of the start of the 2015/16 season. He made his competitive debut in a 1–3 Scottish League Challenge Cup defeat to St Mirren on 25 July.

Kevin is the younger brother of Scottish Rugby star Stewart Walker, who played for Edinburgh Accies, and is now head coach at Gala YM RFC

References

External links

1991 births
Living people
Scottish footballers
Association football goalkeepers
University of Stirling F.C. players
Livingston F.C. players
Berwick Rangers F.C. players
Scottish Professional Football League players
Falkirk F.C. players